The 2009-10 season is FC Kremin Kremenchuk's 5th consecutive season in the Second League Group B.

Key Dates
30 August 2009 – Kremin ends their 610-minute run without conceding a goal in home matches.
6 September 2009 – Kremin lose 3–1 against Tytan at Khimik Stadium in the Druha Liha B. Kremin's unbeaten run ends after 6 games.

Players

Squad information

In

Out

Team kit
The team kits are produced by Puma AG and the shirt sponsor is KremenchukMiaso «Кременчукм’ясо». The home and away kit was retained from previous seasons.

Statistics

Squad stats

Top scorers
Includes all competitive matches. The list is sorted by shirt number when total goals are equal.

Last updated on 26 October 2009

Disciplinary record

Captains
Includes all competitive matches.

Last updated on 26 October 2009

Start formations

Starting 11
These charts below depict the most used starters in the most used start formation. The most recent starters/formations are listed when total starts are equal between two players/formations.

Overall
{|class="wikitable"
|-
|Games played || 14 (13 Second League, 1 Cup)
|-
|Games won || 7
|-
|Games drawn ||  5
|-
|Games lost ||  2 (1 Second League, 1 Cup)
|-
|Goals scored || 26
|-
|Goals conceded || 16
|-
|Goal difference || +10
|-
|Yellow cards || 25
|-
|Red cards || 1
|-
|Worst discipline || Ihor Chernomor (1 , 2 )
|-
|Best result || 4-0 (A) v Olkom – Druha Liha – 3 October 2009
|-
|Worst result || 3-1 (A) v Tytan – Ukrainian Cup – 5 September 2009
|-
|Most appearances || 6 players with 11 appearances
|-
|Top scorer || Vasyl Klimov (10 goals)
|-
|Points || 26/42 (62%)
|-

Club

Coaching staff

Other information

Competitions

Overall

Pre-season

Friendly

Ukrainian Second League

Kremin's fourth consecutive season in Druha Liha began on 17 July 2009 and ends on 22 May 2010.

Classification

Results summary

Results by round

Matches
All kickoff times are in EST.

Ukrainian Cup

First preliminary round

Disciplinary record

References

External links
 FC Kremin Kremenchuk official website

2009-10
Kremin Kremenchuk